Riekoperla is a genus of stonefly in the family Gripopterygidae. It contains the following species:
 Riekoperla darlingtoni

Plecoptera
Plecoptera genera
Taxonomy articles created by Polbot